Lehnheim is a station in Lehnheim, Hesse, Germany on the Vogelsberg Railway (Gießen – Fulda).

Rail Services

The station is served daily by hourly Regionalbahn (RB 45) services on the Limburg (Lahn)–Weilburg–Wetzlar–Gießen–Alsfeld (Oberhess)–Fulda route operated by Hessische Landesbahn. In the peak, additional Regionalbahn services run on the Gießen–Grünberg–Mücke route.

Notes

Railway stations in Hesse
Buildings and structures in Giessen (district)